Yakacık is a village in Antalya Province, Turkey.

Geography
Yakacık is in Gazipaşa district of Antalya Province. It is the easternmost point of Antalya Province. It was issued from Anıtlı (then called Kaledran) on the other side of a creek which is in the neighbouring  Mersin Province. However although the villages are officially issued,  the residents still prefer to use the name Kaledran for both parts.

Economy
Like many Mediterranean coastline villages, Kaledran produces vegetables and  fruits, especially bananas. With several natural beaches, Kaledran's potential for tourism is promising.

References

External links
A local news page (in Turkish)
Yakacik Gazipaşa (in Turkish)

Populated coastal places in Turkey
Villages in Gazipaşa District